The Apocalypse of Golias is a satirical Latin poem of the 12th century, probably written in England or France. Like the Biblical Book of Apocalypse, the poem is addressed to the "Seven Churches", but manuscripts differ as to whether they are the "Seven Churches in England" or "Seven Churches in Neustria".

The Apocalypse of Golias has been ascribed by different scholars to Alan of Lille, Walter of Châtillon, Hugh Primas and Walter Map, but the evidence is against these attributions. The poem is one of a group of about the same date, all connected with the fictional "Bishop Golias", but these poems are not all by the same author.

The poet narrates a vision, a summer dream, in which Pythagoras offers to act as his guide, and gives him a quick view of the scholars and writers of the classical world from Priscian to Hippocrates. An angel then appears to introduce the main theme, a fierce criticism of pope, bishops, priests, archdeacons and deacons, who are successively likened to different animals. Monks are the worst of all, and their greed, gluttony and lust are described in colourful detail.

Bibliography

External links
Latin text from the Bibliotheca Augustana
Latin text with commentary by Thomas Wright (Google Books)
Manuscripts of the Apocalypse
Scanned image of the first page of "The Apocalypse of Bishop Golias" in a 13th-century manuscript from the British Library

12th-century Latin books
12th-century poems
Cultural depictions of Pythagoras
Dreams in fiction
Satirical books
Works by Walter Map
Works of uncertain authorship